The United Nations Educational, Scientific and Cultural Organization (UNESCO) World Heritage Sites are places of importance to cultural or natural heritage as described in the UNESCO World Heritage Convention, established in 1972. Cultural heritage consists of monuments (such as architectural works, monumental sculptures, or inscriptions), groups of buildings, and sites (including archaeological sites). Natural features (consisting of physical and biological formations), geological and physiographical formations (including habitats of threatened species of animals and plants), and natural sites which are important from the point of view of science, conservation or natural beauty, are defined as natural heritage. Luxembourg ratified the convention on 28 September 1983. , Luxembourg has one World Heritage Site listed, City of Luxembourg: its Old Quarters and Fortifications was listed in 1994. Currently, there are no sites listed on the tentative list.

World Heritage Sites 
UNESCO lists sites under ten criteria; each entry must meet at least one of the criteria. Criteria i through vi are cultural, and vii through x are natural.

References

See also
Culture of Luxembourg
Tourism in Luxembourg

World Heritage

Luxembourg
World Heritage Sites